Dan Isaac Slobin (born May 7, 1939) is a Professor Emeritus of psychology and linguistics at the University of California, Berkeley. Slobin has made major contributions to the study of children's language acquisition, and his work has demonstrated the importance of cross-linguistic comparison for the study of language acquisition and psycholinguistics in general.

Slobin received a B.A. in psychology from the University of Michigan in 1960 and a Ph.D. in social psychology from Harvard University in 1964.  In addition to working at the University of California, Berkeley, Slobin has served as a visiting professor at several universities around the world, including Boğaziçi University, Tel-Aviv University, Max Planck Institute for Psycholinguistics, Centre National de la Recherche Scientifique (CNRS), and Stanford University.

Slobin has extensively studied the organization of information about spatial relations and motion events by speakers of different languages, including both children and adults.  He has argued that becoming a competent speaker of a language requires learning certain language-specific modes of thinking, which he dubbed "thinking for speaking".  Slobin's "thinking for speaking" view can be described as a contemporary, moderate version of the Sapir–Whorf hypothesis, which claims that the language we learn shapes the way we perceive reality and think about it.  This view is often contrasted with the "language acquisition device" view of Noam Chomsky and others, who think of language acquisition as a process largely independent of learning and cognitive development.

Research work 
Slobin did a research study, published in 2007, titled the Children use canonical sentence schemas: A crosslinguistic study of word order and inflections. The aim of the study was to show that we must not generalize that the acquiring of English language in children is the same as the acquiring of "x" languages. Slobin proposed that children "construct a canonical sentence schema as a preliminary organizing structure for language behaviour. This canonical sentence schemas provide a functional explanation for the order of words and inflectional strategies based on each child's attempt to quickly master basic communication skills in his or her languages."

For the experiment, Slobin modified an existing method—the task-comparison research methods where he provided the "design for the testing of 48 children (three girls and three boys in each of the eight age groups: 2;0, 2;4, 2;8, 3;0, 3;4, 3;8, 4;0, 4;4). In the task, each child was presented with a pair of toy animals or dolls and was asked to demonstrate an action of one object upon the other. For example: "Here's a camel. Let's think of a little story about him. How about, 'the camel is sleeping'. Can you show me what that would be like?" Over the ten-day period, each child received three different kinds of the test. There were 18 verbs and 18 forms of the test allowing for permutations of word order and case inflections. The results is presented in table forms showing percentages of first-choice in all four languages by order of choice, whether it is Subject-Object, Noun-Object, etc. The most significant data gathered from the results was that Turkish children perform extremely accurate on all the grammatical sentences, even from the youngest age. Overall, the Turkish subjects perform better than children learning other languages. "The English and Italian children in the younger ages perform at an intermediate level and the Serbo-Croatian children had the greatest difficulty."

Slobin believes that language is acquired and is a learning as well as cognitive development in a child. His choice of method is the result of his theoretical stance where, in task-comparison activity, his subjects get exposed to a consistent variety of tests, administered differently over a period of ten days. In task-comparison, his subjects get to perform or answer questions by displaying the instructions given.

His research generally showed that "children seemed prepared to learn both inflectional and word-order languages". His results contradicted his assumptions of "earlier expectations based on the alleged naturalness of fixed word order, the acquisition of Turkish is not at all impaired by the fact that word order is not a cue for semantic relations since all languages differ from one another on a range of dimensions". That is to say, "one can't make generalizations about the acquisition of English as simply as an example of acquisition of a particular "type" of language". Slobin successfully displayed this with the experiment results. However, his subjects were mainly from different European countries as well as North America and none from any countries on the Asian continent. His other work, The frog-story project, gained recognition worldwide.

Other work 
Slobin also designed a project, along with Ruth Berman in the beginning of 1980. He created "The frog-story project", a research tool which was a children's storybook that tells a story in 24 pictures with no words (Frog Where Are You? by Mercer Mayer). This makes it possible to elicit narratives that are comparable in content but differing in form, across age and languages. There is now data from dozens of languages and most of the world's major language types. The Berman & Slobin study compared English, German, Spanish, Hebrew and Turkish on a range of dimensions.

His project was also mentioned in Raphael Berthele, a professor in the University of Fribourg, Switzerland on her work in the Crosslinguistic approaches to the psychology approach by Elena Lieven, Jiansheng Guo.

References

External links 
 Dan Slobin's Homepage

Living people
American cognitive scientists
Developmental psycholinguists
University of Michigan College of Literature, Science, and the Arts alumni
Harvard University alumni
University of California, Berkeley faculty
Linguists from the United States
Fellows of the American Academy of Arts and Sciences
Bilingualism and second-language acquisition researchers
Fellows of the American Association for the Advancement of Science
1939 births
Fellows of the Linguistic Society of America